The northern grizzled skipper (Pyrgus centaureae) is a species of skipper butterfly (family Hesperiidae) with a range in North America from the subarctic to the north, New Mexico to the south, and the Appalachian Mountains to the east.
 
While generally similar to most other Pyrgus species, this species has a greyer brown background colour with bold white spots on both the forewing and hindwing. Unlike most other Pyrgus species, the veins on the underside are obviously lined white. Wingspan is 25 to 33 mm.

One generation is produced per year in its southern range from March to May. Two years are required for each brood in the subarctic. Larval food plants include cloudberry (Rubus chamaemorus),  wild strawberry (Fragaria virginiana),  dwarf cinquefoil (Potentilla canadensis), and varileaf cinquefoil (Potentilla diversifolia).

Subspecies
Pyrgus centaureae centaureae
Pyrgus centaureae freija (Warren, 1924) (Canada)
Pyrgus centaureae wyandot (Edwards, 1863)
Pyrgus centaureae loki Evans, 1953 (Colorado)

References

Whalley, Paul - Mitchell Beazley Guide to Butterflies (1981, reprinted 1992)

External links
Lepiforum.de

Pyrgus
Butterflies described in 1839
Butterflies of Europe